Samuell Williamson (born September 7, 2000) is an American college basketball player for the SMU Mustangs of the American Athletic Conference (AAC).

High school career
Williamson attended Rockwall High School in Rockwall, Texas for his four years of high school. As a junior, Williamson averaged 23.3 points and 9.7 rebounds in helping Rockwall to a 20–12 record, earning first-team Texas Association of Basketball Coaches all-state honors. As a senior in 2018–19, Williamson averaged 25 points, 11.2 rebounds, and 4.1 assists to guide Rockwall High School to a 30–6 record, the regional semifinals and a No. 8 ranking in the final regular-season Class 6A state poll.

Recruiting
On September 17, 2018, Williamson committed to play at the University of Louisville.

Williamson was initially a four-star recruit but he became a five-star recruit by the end of his senior season. 

He was considered a five-star recruit by Rivals, 247Sports, and ESPN.

College career
Williamson scored 13 points and grabbed five rebounds in his college debut, a 87–74 win over Miami (FL). He scored a season-high 15 points to go with five rebounds on November 13, 2019, in a 91–62 win over Indiana State. As a freshman, Williamson averaged 4.4 points, 2.5 rebounds, and 0.6 assists per game.

In Williamson's sophomore season debut against Seton Hall, he injured his toe, forcing him to miss at least one game. He averaged 9.6 points, 8.1 rebounds, and 1.2 assists per game.

On March 26, 2022, Williamson entered the transfer portal. He would eventually transfer to SMU.

Career statistics

College

|-
| style="text-align:left;"| 2019–20
| style="text-align:left;"| Louisville
| 31 || 1 || 15.3 || .470 || .333 || .690 || 2.5 || .6 || .3 || .2 || 4.4
|-
| style="text-align:left;"| 2020–21
| style="text-align:left;"| Louisville
| 18 || 15 || 28.6 || .479 || .250 || .706 || 8.1 || 1.2 || .3 || .1 || 9.6
|-
| style="text-align:left;"| 2021–22
| style="text-align:left;"| Louisville
| 30 || 6 || 16.9 || .456 || .154 || .569 || 3.7 || .8 || .5 || .1 || 5.6
|- class="sortbottom"
| style="text-align:center;" colspan="2"| Career
| 79 || 22 || 18.9 || .468 || .263 || .640 || 4.2 || .8 || .4 || .1 || 6.0

References

External links
SMU Mustangs bio
Louisville Cardinals bio
USA Basketball bio

2000 births
Living people
American men's basketball players
Basketball players from Texas
Louisville Cardinals men's basketball players
SMU Mustangs men's basketball players
McDonald's High School All-Americans
People from Rowlett, Texas
Shooting guards
Small forwards